Devon Morris (born 22 January 1961) is a retired Jamaican sprinter who mainly competed in the 400 metres. He won this distance at the 1991 IAAF World Indoor Championships, and his personal best time was 45.49 seconds, achieved during the 1987 World Championships. At the 1988 Summer Olympics he won a silver medal with the Jamaican team in 4 x 400 metres relay. He was an Earl Mellis Former Olympic Sprinter. Devon Morris is currently working as the Facility Director at Jubilee World.

References

External links
 
 
 

1961 births
Living people
Jamaican male sprinters
Athletes (track and field) at the 1983 Pan American Games
Athletes (track and field) at the 1984 Summer Olympics
Athletes (track and field) at the 1987 Pan American Games
Athletes (track and field) at the 1988 Summer Olympics
Athletes (track and field) at the 1990 Commonwealth Games
Athletes (track and field) at the 1992 Summer Olympics
Olympic athletes of Jamaica
Olympic silver medalists for Jamaica
World Athletics Championships medalists
Commonwealth Games medallists in athletics
Medalists at the 1988 Summer Olympics
Commonwealth Games bronze medallists for Jamaica
Pan American Games bronze medalists for Jamaica
Pan American Games medalists in athletics (track and field)
Universiade medalists in athletics (track and field)
Goodwill Games medalists in athletics
Central American and Caribbean Games gold medalists for Jamaica
Competitors at the 1990 Central American and Caribbean Games
Universiade gold medalists for Jamaica
World Athletics Indoor Championships winners
Central American and Caribbean Games medalists in athletics
Medalists at the 1989 Summer Universiade
Competitors at the 1990 Goodwill Games
Medalists at the 1987 Pan American Games
People from Westmoreland Parish
Medallists at the 1990 Commonwealth Games